Uzinaza is an ancient Roman-Berber city located in present-day Algeria. It is located in the modern commune of Saneg.

History
Uzinaza was founded by Septimius Severus in 205 AD in central-western Numidia. The city contains the ruins of a Roman villa dating back to its founding king, which bore the Latinized Berber name of Usinadis.

The shape of the enclosure of the site is that of an irregular rectangle of 300m in length and 200m in width; it is formed by a wall with two meters thick frame of uncut stones. Some columns, pottery fragments and a sarcophagus are on the same ruins, that are near the small river where stood the destroyed walls.

After the Arab conquest in the early eighth century the city disappeared, and now there it is nearby the village of Saneg.

References

Further reading
Les voies romaines de l'Afrique du Nord

See also

 Mauretania Caesariensis
 Icosium
 Altava
 Rapidum
 Rusadir
 Pomaria

Archaeological sites in Algeria
Roman towns and cities in Mauretania Caesariensis
Ancient Berber cities
Populated places established in the 3rd century
200s establishments
200s establishments in the Roman Empire
Coloniae (Roman)